Parvesh Chander Sharma is an Indian weightlifter from Punjab. At the 1990 Commonwealth Games, he won two gold medals in the Men's Featherweight – Clean and Jerk, Men's Featherweight – Overall and one silver medal in Men's Featherweight-Snatch.

Records/Medals in Weightlifting

International Level

National Level

References

Indian male weightlifters
Weightlifters at the 1990 Commonwealth Games
Living people
Weightlifters from Punjab, India
1956 births
Commonwealth Games gold medallists for India
Commonwealth Games silver medallists for India
Commonwealth Games medallists in weightlifting
Medallists at the 1990 Commonwealth Games